The Great White Way is a 1924 American silent comedy film centered on the sport of boxing. It was directed by E. Mason Hopper and produced by Cosmopolitan Productions and distributed through Goldwyn Pictures. The film was made with the cooperation of the New York City Fire Department. The film stars Oscar Shaw and Anita Stewart. It was remade twelve years later as Cain and Mabel with Marion Davies and Clark Gable.

Plot
As described in a film magazine review, ambitious press agent Jack Murray introduces two of his clients, Follies dancer Mabel Vandegrift and prize fighter Joe Cain, to each other and they fall in love. After Brock Morton, the owner of the show, says that he will bring down the curtain on the show in the middle of opening night unless Mabel renounces Joe, the latter goes on the stage and announces that, in spite of his prior refusal, that he will fight the English boxing champion. With the money he gets from boxing promoter Tex Rickard, he buys out Morton and the show goes on. Prior to the fight, Morton dopes Joe, but he is brought around so that he is able to fight and eventually wins the match. Joe's father comes east and then brings Joe and Mabel back west with him.

Cast

Preservation
With no prints of The Great White Way located in any film archives, it is a lost film.

References

External links
 
 
 
 
 Still from www.agefotostock.com
 Anita Stewart at about the time of the film at silenthollywood.com

1924 films
American boxing films
American silent feature films
Films directed by E. Mason Hopper
Lost American films
Goldwyn Pictures films
1924 comedy films
Silent American comedy films
American black-and-white films
1924 lost films
Lost comedy films
1920s American films